Operation Inherent Resolve (OIR) is the U.S. military's operational name for the international military intervention against the Islamic State, including both a campaign in Iraq and a campaign in Syria, with a closely-related campaign in Libya. Through 18 September 2018, the U.S. Army's III Armored Corps was responsible for Combined Joint Task Force – Operation Inherent Resolve (CJTF—OIR) and were replaced by the XVIII Airborne Corps. The campaign is primarily waged by American and British air forces in support of local allies, most prominently the Iraqi security forces and Syrian Democratic Forces (SDF). Combat ground troops, mostly special forces, infantry, and artillery have also been deployed, especially in Iraq. Of the airstrikes, 70% have been conducted by the military of the United States, 20% by the United Kingdom and the remaining 10% being carried out by France, Turkey, Canada, the Netherlands, Denmark, Belgium, Saudi Arabia, the United Arab Emirates, Australia and Jordan.

According to the Pentagon, by March 2019, the day of the territorial defeat in Syria of the Islamic State (IS), CJTF-OIR and its partner forces had liberated nearly 110,000 square kilometers (42,471 square miles) of land and 7.7 million people from IS, the vast majority of the self-proclaimed caliphate's territory and subjects. By October 2017, around the time of IS's territorial defeat in Iraq, CJTF-OIR claimed that around 80,000 IS militants had been killed by it and its allies (excluding those targeted by Russian and Syrian Air Force strikes). By the end of August 2019, it had conducted 34,573 strikes. Tens of thousands more were killed by partner forces on the ground (the SDF alone claimed to have killed 25,336 IS fighters by the end of 2017).

History

2014 

Unlike their coalition partners, and unlike previous combat operations, no name was initially given to the conflict against IS by the U.S. government. The decision to keep the conflict nameless drew considerable media criticism.

The U.S. decided in October 2014 to name its military efforts against IS as "Operation Inherent Resolve"; the U.S. Central Command (CENTCOM) news release announcing the name noted that:

The US Defense Department announced at the end of October 2014 that troops operating in support of Operation Inherent Resolve after 15 June were eligible  for the Global War on Terrorism Expeditionary Medal.

By 4 December 2014, three U.S. service members had died from accidents or non-combat injuries.

2015 

On 22 October 2015, a U.S. Master Sergeant, Joshua Wheeler, was killed in action when he, with about 30 other U.S. special operations soldiers and a Peshmerga unit, conducted a prison break near Hawija in the disputed territories of Northern Iraq, in which about 70 hostages were rescued, five IS members were captured and "a number" were killed or wounded. Sergeant First Class Thomas Payne was awarded the Medal of Honor for his actions during the operation. The Kurdistan Regional Government said after the raid that none of the 15 prisoners it was intended to rescue were found.

From May, North American Rockwell OV-10 Broncos joined the operation, flying more than 120 combat sorties over 82 days. It is speculated they provided close air support for special forces missions. The experiment ended satisfactorily, but a US Air Force spokesman stated it remains unlikely they will invest in reactivating the OV-10 on a regular basis because of the overhead cost of operating an additional aircraft type.

2016 

By 9 March 2016, nearly 11,000 airstrikes had been launched on IS (and occasionally Al-Nusra), killing over 27,000 fighters and striking over 22,000 targets, including 139 tanks, 371 Humvees, and 1,216 pieces of oil infrastructure. Approximately 80% of these airstrikes have been conducted by American forces, with the remaining 20% being launched by other members of the coalition, such as the United Kingdom and Australia. 7,268 strikes hit targets in Iraq, while 3,602 hit targets in Syria. On 12 June 2016, it was reported that 120 IS leaders, commanders, propagandists, recruiters and other high-value individuals were killed so far this year.

Until March 2016, U.S. military members were ineligible for Campaign Medals and other service decorations due to the continuing ambiguous nature of the continuing U.S. involvement in Iraq. However, on 30 March 2016, U.S. Secretary of Defense Ash Carter announced the creation of a new medal, named "Inherent Resolve Campaign Medal".

By 27 July 2016, U.S. and coalition partners had conducted more than 14,000 airstrikes in Iraq and Syria: Nearly 11,000 of those strikes were from U.S. aircraft and the majority of the strikes (more than 9,000) were in Iraq. Of the 26,374 targets hit, nearly 8,000 were against IS fighting positions, while approximately 6,500 hit buildings; IS staging areas and oil infrastructure were each hit around 1,600 times. On 15 December 2016, the U.K. Defense Secretary Michael Fallon said that "more than 25,000 Daesh fighters have now been killed," a number that was half of the United States' estimate. When asked about this discrepancy, the UK's Ministry of Defense said that it stood by his estimate.

Since the first U.S. airstrikes on IS targets in Iraq on 8 August 2014, over two years, the U.S. military has spent over $8.4 billion fighting IS.

BBC News reported in 2017 that according to the American think tank Council on Foreign Relations, in 2016 alone, the U.S. dropped 12,192 bombs in Syria and 12,095 in Iraq.

Operation Odyssey Lightning 
From August to December 2016, the U.S. conducted another similar operation in Libya, code-named Operation Odyssey Lightning, during the battle to capture Sirte, which was the local capital of IS's Libyan branch. In September 2017, the US Africa Command announced that 495 precision airstrikes were carried out and 800 to 900 IS fighters were killed during the operation in Sirte between 1 August and 19 December 2016. On 18 January 2017, US B-2 bombers bombed 2 IS camps to the south of Sirte, killing 90 IS militants.

2017 

According to the Syrian Observatory for Human Rights, Coalition airstrikes have killed 7,043 people across Syria, of which: 5,768 dead were IS fighters, 304 Al-Nusra Front militants and other rebels, 90 government soldiers and 881 civilians. The air strikes occurred in the period between 22 September 2014 and 23 January 2017.

In March 2017, various media outlets reported that conventional forces from the 11th MEU, as well as special operations forces in the form of the 75th Ranger Regiment deployed to Syria to support U.S.-backed forces in liberating Raqqa from IS occupation. The deployment marked an escalation in the U.S. intervention in Syria.

By February 28, the Coalition had conducted 3,271 sorties in 2017, 2,129 of which resulted in at least one weapon released. In total, the coalition released 7,040 weapons in Iraq and Syria in this same time period in an effort to destroy IS.

As of August 9, 2017, coalition aircraft flew a total of 167,912 sorties, and conducted 13,331 strikes in Iraq and 11,235 strikes in Syria, for a total of 24,566 strikes.

2018 

In February 2018, the 2nd Brigade Combat Team, 101st Airborne Division was awarded a campaign streamer following its deployment to Iraq. In May 2016, the brigade deployed to advise and assist, train and equip Iraqi security forces to fight the Islamic State of Iraq. The 2nd Brigade also conducted precision surface-to-surface fires and supported a multitude of intelligence and logistical operations for coalition and Iraqi forces. They also provided base security throughout more than 12 areas of operations. The Brigade also aided in the clearance of IS from Fallujah, the near elimination of suicide attacks in Baghdad, and the introduction of improved tactics that liberated more than 100 towns and villages. The 2nd Brigade, 101st Airborne Division also played a significant role in the liberation of Mosul.

2019 

In early 2019, the US-led coalition focused on the final assault on ISIS in the Euphrates pocket, including the Battle of Baghuz Fawqani in the first quarter of the year. Civilian human shields held by ISIS were among the victims, including in one reported massacre on 19 March in which up to 300 civilians, including 45 children, were alleged to have been killed by Coalition forces.

From August 8, 2014, to August 29, 2019, coalition aircraft conducted a total of 34,573 strikes.

On 27 October 2019, Abu Bakr al-Baghdadi was killed during the Barisha raid in Idlib Governorate.

On 31 December 2019, the CJTF-OIR reported its forces were "closely monitoring the current situation of the protests at the US Embassy in Baghdad", adding that they were "taking the appropriate force protection measures to ensure [US Embassy personnel] safety".

2020 

CJTF-OIR paused all training and anti-ISIS operations on January 5, 2020, to focus on protecting Iraqi bases hosting Coalition troops in the wake of several rocket attacks. This action was also linked to the anticipated response against Coalition forces in the wake of the killing of Iranian General Qasem Soleimani. In March 2020, the U.S. military started to withdraw from various bases in Iraq.

2021 

On 31 March 2021, Carrier Air Wing Three launched naval flight operations in support of Operation Inherent Resolve. The USS Dwight D. Eisenhower and its carrier strike group were expected to lead Task Force 50, which oversees Operation Inherent Resolve's naval strike operations.

2022

Assets 

United States Air Force, United States Navy & United States Marine Corps units that are participating in this operations can be found in the aerial and ground order of battle.

U.S. and coalition forces are training Iraqi forces at four sites: in al-Asad in Anbar province, Erbil in the north, and Taji and Besmayah in the Baghdad area.

 Combined Joint Forces Land Component Command-Iraq
 1st Infantry Division 1st Cavalry division 
 3rd Brigade Combat Team, 82nd Airborne Division (January – September 2015).
 2nd Battalion, 505th Infantry Regiment
 3rd Brigade Combat Team, 10th Mountain Division
 1st Brigade Combat Team, 10th Mountain Division (September 2015 – June 2016).
 2nd Brigade Combat Team, 101st Airborne Division (Air Assault) (June 2016 – January 2017).
1st Battalion, 502nd Infantry Regiment
 2nd Brigade Combat Team, 82nd Airborne Division (January 2017 – October 2017)
 2nd Battalion, 325th Airborne Infantry Regiment
 2nd Battalion, 82nd Field Artillery Regiment (January 2017 – October 2017)
28th Expeditionary Combat Aviation Brigade, 28th Infantry Division
35th Combat Aviation Brigade, 35th Infantry Division (Summer 2018- Summer 2019)
3rd Cavalry Regiment (Spring 2018 – Spring 2019)

 United States Marine Corps

 Marine Air-Ground Task Force (MAGTF)
 Special Purpose Marine Air-Ground Task Force – Crisis Response – Central Command

Military bases 

During the operation in Syria, there were several bases mostly in the north:

 Al-Hasakah Governorate
 Ash Shaddadi 
 Hasaka Dam	
 Kharab al-Jeer near Al-Malikiyah
 Rmelan (airbase)
 Tal Tamir
 Tell Beydar
 Aleppo Governorate
 Ayn al-Arab
 Dadat (outpost)
 Harab Isk (airbase)
 Sabt (airbase)
 Sarrin
 Ushariya (outpost)
 Deir ez-Zor Governorate
 al-Omar oil fields
 Mission Support Site Conoco
 "Green Village"
 Homs Governorate
 Al-Tanf
 Raqqa Governorate
 Ayn Issa
 al-Tabqah (airbase)
 Tal al-Samn

However, following the 2019 Turkish offensive into north-eastern Syria, most U.S. soldiers withdrew from northern Syria to western Iraq in October 2019, while even bombing their own Lafarge basement near Harab Isk.

Meanwhile, The New York Times reported that the Pentagon was planning to "leave 150 Special Operations forces at a base called al-Tanf". In addition, 200 U.S. soldiers would remain in eastern Syria near the oil fields, to prevent the Islamic State, Syrian government and Russian forces from advancing in the region. However, at least 600–900 U.S. Troops are expected to stay in Syria, in Al-Hasakah and Deir ez-Zor Governorates. In July 2020, the U.S. military built a new base including an airport, located between Um Kahif village and Tal Alu silos near Al-Yaarubiyah.

Casualties 

According to Airwars, in 2014 there were 63 incidents involving the US-led coalition in Iraq and Syria in which there were civilian casualties, causing at least 160 civilian deaths. In 2015, there were 268 incidents and 708 deaths. In 2016, there were 483 incidents and 1,372 deaths. Civilian casualties peaked in 2017, with 1,841 incidents and at least 4,677 civilian deaths.

According to Airwars, 1,472 civilians were killed by the U.S. air campaign in Iraq and Syria in March 2017 alone. On March 17, a U.S.-led coalition airstrike in Mosul killed more than 200 civilians. Data compiled by Airwars shows that 229 strikes in Iraq and 878 strikes in Syria were carried out by Coalition forces in June 2017, killing an alleged total of 1,483 people. The reporting of 875 of those total alleged deaths is contested. In July 2017, Airwars recorded reports of an alleged 1,342 people were killed in Iraq and Syria by Coalition airstrikes. Of the allegations 812 were contested, and two were disproved.

Casualty figures fell after the 2017 peak. According to Airwars, 2018 saw 192 incidents and 846 deaths; 2019 saw 72 incidents and 467 deaths. In 2019, the casualties were concentrated in the first quarter during the Battle of Baghuz Fawqani including an alleged massacre of civilian human shields on 19 March.

By 2020, Airwars had recorded a five-year total of 14,771 US-led Coalition strikes in Iraq and 19,829 in Syria and investigated 2,921 alleged civilian casualty incidents, estimating 8,259–13,135 civilian deaths, of whom around 2,000 were children, although the Coalition itself estimated just 1,377 or 1,417 civilian deaths.

The New York Times reported that efforts to minimize and count civilian deaths fell far short of the approach promised by the US military for its use of airstrikes in the war against IS. The Times reported that airstrikes against IS, as well as in the war in Afghanistan, was marked by "flawed intelligence, poor targeting and thousands of civilian deaths."   The Times reported that efforts to minimize civilian casualties diminished after President Trump assumed office in 2017, stating "... the authority to approve strikes was pushed further down the chain of command, even as an overwhelming majority of strikes were carried out in the heat of war, and not planned far in advance."  The Times reported that the US military systematically under-reported casualties, providing a total death count of 1,417, when the actual count was significantly higher.   The report states that the military made little effort to accurately determine civilian casualties after the airstrikes.  The military was also reluctant to divulge information about the casualties, in spite of promises of transparency, and news media were required to make numerous requests under the Freedom of Information Act, and had to repeatedly sue the US military to produce data.

Talon Anvil

During the years 2014 to 2019, an Air Force special operations group named Talon Anvil killed a significant number of non-combatant civilians, and often failed to follow US military protocols designed to minimize civilian casualties.  In one particular bomb strike, in March 2019, the Baghuz airstrike, approximately 50 women and children were killed, and the Air Force subsequently covered the deaths up. The Talon Anvil group operated under the auspices of Task Force 9, which was the US military unit responsible for ground operations in the war against IS in Syria. The group consisted of about 20 plains-clothes military personnel that operated out of anonymous office buildings in Iraq and Syria. In December 2021,  the  US Secretary of Defense ordered an investigation into the civilian deaths caused by Talon Anvil's bombing strikes.

See also 
 Combined Joint Task Force – Operation Inherent Resolve, commander headquarters of ongoing operations
 Military intervention against the Islamic State aerial order of battle
 German intervention against the Islamic State, also named Operation Counter Daesh, related German operations
 Opération Chammal, name for similar French operations
 Operation Impact, name for similar Canadian operations
 Operation Martyr Yalçın, name for similar Turkish operation against IS
 Operation Okra, name for similar Australian operations
 Operation Shader, name for similar British operations
 Operation Tidal Wave II, name of a suboperation against IS oil infrastructure

References

External links 

 Operation Inherent Resolve – Official Website
 Global Coalition – Official Website
 Air Superiority Under 2000 Feet: Lessons From Waging Drone Warfare Against ISIL

 
2010s in Syria
Battles involving the Islamic State of Iraq and the Levant
Counterterrorism in the United States
Foreign policy of the Barack Obama administration
Islamic State of Iraq and the Levant and the United States
Military operations of the War in Iraq (2013–2017) involving the United States
Military operations of the Syrian civil war involving the United States
Operations involving special forces